Gustav Ferdinand Richard Radde (27 November 1831 – 2 March 1903) was a German naturalist and Siberian explorer. Radde's warbler and several other species are named after him.

Biography

Radde was born in Danzig, the son of a schoolmaster. He had little formal education, and began a career as an apothecary. At an early age he was influenced by Anton Menge and became increasingly interested in natural history, and in 1852 he gave up his career and spent two years in the Crimea with the botanist Christian von Steven, collecting both plants and animals. He made further trips to southern Russia with Johann Friedrich von Brandt and Karl Ernst von Baer. He was botanist and zoologist on the East Siberian Expedition of 1855, led by the astronomer Ludwig Schwarz.

In 1864 he eventually settled in Tbilisi. In the same year he explored the region surrounding Mount Elbrus, the highest mountain in the Western Palearctic. As well as collecting many plants he recorded the languages, ballads and customs of the local tribes. He set up a museum (the Caucasus Museum) and library in Tbilisi to exhibit his discoveries. His collecting expeditions included visits along the Black Sea coast and eastwards beyond the Caspian Sea to Askhabad. In 1895 he sailed to India and Japan with the Grand Duke Michael, and two years later he was official naturalist on a visit by members of the Russian imperial family to North Africa. He eventually became a member of the Council of State in Tbilisi.

In 1884 he was honoured with the chairmanship of the first International Ornithological Congress in Vienna. He was also an honorary member of the Deutsche Ornithologen-Gesellschaft, and a foreign member of the British Ornithologists' Union and the Zoological Society of London. He was awarded the Patron's Medal of the Royal Geographical Society in 1889 and the Constantine Medal of the Imperial Russian Geographical Society in 1898.

Eponyms
Animals named after him include birds such as Radde's warbler and Radde's accentor, and amphibians and reptiles such as the Mongolian toad (Pseudepidalea raddei), the Azerbaijan lizard (Darevskia raddei), a toadhead agama (Phrynocephalus raddei),  and Radde's mountain viper (Montivipera raddei).

Collections
Radde was an avid entomologist. His insect (and other) collections are divided: Transbaikal and Amur material is in the Zoological Museum of the Russian Academy of Science; Caucasus and Transcaspian material is in the Georgian National Museum Zoological Section, Tbilisi.

This botanist is denoted by the author abbreviation Radde when citing a botanical name.

Works
His publications include:
 Reisen im Süden von Ost-Sibirien in den Jahren 1855-59 (“Travels in the south of eastern Siberia during the years 1855-59,” 1862–1863)
 Vier Vorträge über den Kaukasus (“Four essays on the Caucasus,” 1874) 
 Die Chews'uren und ihr Land (“The Chews'uren and their land,” 1878)
 Ornis Caucasica. Die Vogelwelt des Kaukasus (“Ornis Caucasica.  The world of birds in the Caucasus,” 1884) at archive.org
 Das Ostufer des Pontus (“The east bank of the Pontus,” 1894)
 Die Sammlungen des kaukasischen Museums (“The collections of the Caucasus Museum,” 1900 et seq.)
In 1892, he wrote a Russian description of his voyage with the grand dukes Alexander and Sergeis Mikhailovitch.

Notes

References
 Barbara and Richard Mearns - Biographies for Birdwatchers 
 Anonym 1903 [Radde, G. F. R.] Wien. ent. Ztg. 22 108
 Blasius, R. 1904 [Radde, G. F. R.]  Journ. Ornith. 52 1-49
 Daniel, K. 1904 [Radde, G. F. R.]  Münch. Koleopt. Zeitschr. 2 1904-1906(1) 93
 Kraatz, G. 1903 [Radde, G. F. R.] Dtsch. ent. Ztschr. 47 7

External links
 

Botanists with author abbreviations
1831 births
1903 deaths
19th-century German botanists
Explorers of Asia
German ornithologists
19th-century German zoologists
German entomologists
Scientists from Gdańsk
People from the Province of Prussia
German non-fiction writers
Explorers of the Caucasus
German male non-fiction writers